Mount Emmons is a post-caldera stratovolcano within the Emmons Lake caldera on the Alaska Peninsula within the Lake and Peninsula Borough, Alaska, United States.

Description
The summit is one of three cones constructed within the  caldera, which also contains an elongated crater lake on its southwest side.

The most recent of several caldera-forming eruptions at Emmons Lake occurred more than 10,000 years ago. No historical eruptions have occurred at Emmons Lake.

The peak is located within the Alaska Peninsula National Wildlife Refuge.

Mount Emmons is a local name published on a USGS map in 1943.

See also

 List of mountain peaks of Alaska

References

External links

Mountains of Alaska
Aleutian Range
Volcanoes of Alaska
VEI-6 volcanoes
Volcanic crater lakes
Volcanoes of Aleutians East Borough, Alaska
Calderas of Alaska
Mountains of Aleutians East Borough, Alaska
Stratovolcanoes of the United States